Moulden is a surname.  Notable people with the surname include:

 Beaumont Arnold Moulden (1849–1926), lawyer and politician in South Australia
 Frank Beaumont Moulden (1876–1932), his son, lawyer and Lord Mayor of Adelaide
 Horace M. Moulden (born 1898), British trade union leader
 Julia Moulden, Canadian writer
 Paul Moulden (born 1967), English footballer

See also
 Moulden, Northern Territory, suburb of Palmerston, Australia